Assi IF is a Swedish football team, located in Risögrund, Kalix Municipality, Norrbotten County, currently playing in Division 2 Norrland.

Background

Assi IF is a club that dates back to 1915. The current club was established in 1968 when Karlsborgs IK and Risöns AIS merged under the influence of the AB Statens Skogsindustrier. The men's team has played in the lower divisions of the Swedish football league system in Divisions 2, 3, 4 and 5. The club's most successful period was in the late 1990s when they spent 3 seasons in Division 2 in 1996, 1998 and 1999. The women's soccer team played in the Swedish top division in 1979.

The club has made considerable development in recent years and is now the largest in Eastern Norrbotten with 800 members of whom around 350 are active.  The club run a large number of teams many of which face log trips for competitive matches.

The club won the Midnattsolscupen (Midnight Sun Cup) in 1991, 1995 and 1999.

The club is affiliated to the Norrbottens Fotbollförbund.

Season to season

2013 squad

Staff and board members
  Lennart Vikström – President
  Ingela Resin – Secretary
  Soren Hahto – Treasurer
  Bertil Johansson – Director

External links
  Official Website
  Men’s Team

Footnotes

Football clubs in Norrbotten County
Association football clubs established in 1968
1968 establishments in Sweden
Sport in Kalix